The Maghreb barbel (Luciobarbus maghrebensis) is a ray-finned fish species in the family Cyprinidae. It is found in Morocco.

The taxonomy and systematics of the Maghreb barbs are subject to considerable dispute. Some authors consider L. maghrebensis a distinct species, while others include it in the Algerian barb (L. callensis).  Furthermore, some taxonomists consider B. labiosa conspecific with L. maghrebensis when the latter is considered distinct.  It is found in the Sebou basin and rivers flowing into the Moulay Bouselham Lagoon on the Atlantic slope in north-central Morocco.

References

Maghreb barbel
Endemic fauna of Morocco
Freshwater fish of North Africa
Maghreb barbel